Gordonia fruticosa is a species of shrub or tree in the family Theaceae. It is native to North and South America.

References

fruticosa
Trees of Peru